The 1890 Syracuse Orangemen football team was an American football team that represented Syracuse University during the 1890 college football season. In their first season under head coach Robert Winston, the Orangemen compiled a 7–4 record.

Previous season
Syracuse Chancellor Charles N. Sims wanted the athletic program at SU to be as competitive as those at Yale and Harvard. To achieve this goal, he encouraged the development of a more challenging academic program and a healthier campus environment. However, the necessary infrastructure was already in place for team captain John Blake Hillyer to form a football team. In October 1889, Hillyer created the University Athletic Association, a student-run organization that managed the finances and logistics for various sports and the football program at Syracuse was now officially recognized. Syracuse played its first football game on November 23, 1889, recording a 36–0 loss to Rochester.

Hillyer returned the next year with Robert "Bobby" Winston as the head coach. Winston, who became the first head coach of Syracuse football, was paid $35 per month (plus expenses).

Schedule

Source:

References

Syracuse
Syracuse Orange football seasons
Syracuse Orangemen football